Flip or Flop is a television series airing on HGTV hosted by real estate investors Tarek El Moussa and Christina Hall, who were formerly married until 2017.

Series overview

Episodes

Season 1

Season 2

Season 3

Season 4

Season 5

Season 6

Season 7

Season 8

Season 9

From Rags to Riches

References

Flip or Flop
Flip or Flop (franchise)